Wins & Losses is the third studio album by American rapper Meek Mill. It was released on July 21, 2017, by Maybach Music Group and Atlantic Records Group. It is the follow-up to Meek Mill's second album Dreams Worth More Than Money (2015) and his Meekend Music EP series. It includes guest appearances from Rick Ross, Future, Quavo, Young Thug, Lil Uzi Vert, Chris Brown, Ty Dolla Sign, Yo Gotti, The-Dream, Teyana Taylor, and Verse Simmonds. Production derives from Meek Mill's first signed Dreamchaser producer Papamitrou, Streetrunner, DJ Mustard, Street Symphony, Wheezy, Maaly Raw, Dougie On The Beat and Honorable C.N.O.T.E.

Wins and Losses received generally positive reviews and debuted at number three on the Billboard 200 with 102,000 album-equivalent units, of which 37,000 were pure album sales. It has gone on to sell more than 500,000 units in the United States and is certified gold. The album was supported by two singles: Whatever You Need featuring Chris Brown and Ty Dolla Sign, and "Young Black America" featuring The-Dream.

Background
After releasing numerous EPs such as 4/4 (2016) and the Meekend Music series (2017), Wins and Losses was announced in May 2017 by Rick Ross, while the album cover and tracklist were revealed in mid-July 2017 a few weeks before release. Meek Mill explained the concept behind Wins and Losses during an interview with Streetz 94.5, saying:

Promotion
On June 2, 2017, Meek Mill partnered with Spotify and released a video of him freestyling. The video premiered on the playlist "Rap Caviar". Meek Mill officially acknowledged the album in it. On July 10, 2017, Meek Mill released a trailer for the album as well as a trailer for a short film titled, Wins and Losses: The Movie. The movie was directed by Spike Jordan. He also released the official cover artwork for Wins and Losses the same day. Wins and Losses: The Movie was released in 4 parts, and was uploaded to YouTube daily from July 17 until July 20, 2017, leading up to the release of the album. The full movie was uploaded to YouTube the day the album was released, the film featured music from the album. Meek Mill went on to promote the album with interviews from Hot 97 and Power 105.1 leading up to release.

Singles
The lead single, "Whatever You Need" featuring Chris Brown and Ty Dolla Sign, was released on June 1, 2017. The song was produced by DJ Mustard, with co-production from James Royo and Rance from musical ensemble 1500 or Nothin'. The song samples "Whatever You Want" by Tony! Toni! Toné!. It has since peaked at number 51 on the US Billboard Hot 100.

The second single, "Young Black America" featuring The-Dream was released on June 24, 2017, accompanied by a music video. The song was produced by Street Symphony and D.O. Speaks, and samples "Blueprint (Momma Loves Me)", by Jay-Z. On August 17, 2017 Meek performed the song on the Tonight Show Starring Jimmy Fallon.

Other songs
Meek Mill released "Glow Up" as a promotional single on May 22, 2017, and the music video was released the next day. Meek Mill released the "Issues" on July 13, 2017, the music video was released the next day and features cameo appearances from PnB Rock, Jim Jones, XXXTentacion, and Danny García. On July 24, 2017 it was revealed by YouTube personality DJ Akademiks that the clean version of "1942 Flows" features an extended second verse, that allegedly contains a subliminal diss aimed at fellow rapper Drake.

On July 28, 2017 Meek Mill released the music video for "We Ball" featuring Young Thug. WorldStarHipHop premiered the music video for "Price" on August 1, 2017.

Critical reception

Wins & Losses received generally positive reviews from critics upon release. At Metacritic, which assigns a normalized rating out of 100 to reviews from mainstream publications, the album received an average score of 72, based on four reviews. Sheldon Pearce of Pitchfork praised the album's subject matter, commenting: "Much like his major label debut, Dreams and Nightmares, his new album juxtaposes rap dreams and hood realities, but draws more deliberate distinctions. He recognizes rapping as salvation from street life, not some gladiatorial clash inside an echo chamber. Meek makes the case there’s more than one way to win, and that being bested in the rap coliseum isn’t nearly as devastating a blow as seeing close friends die. Subliminal shots don’t hit the way real ones do. The album is a comeback by any measure, honest and gripping." In a positive review for HotNewHipHop, Richard Bryan said Win & Losses "seems, primarily, to be about emotional growth for Meek Mill—even an outlet for it—and Meek coming to an understanding that life is about both successes and failures." Writing for The Ringer, Justin Charity praised the album, declaring it Meek Mill's "most polished and passionate album of his troubled career." M.T Richards of Exclaim! was more critical of the album, describing it as "a letdown." He wrote: "From 'Save Me' to '1942 Flows,' 'Glow Up' to 'These Scars,' the songs here are grayish and oppressively monochromatic, with stiff, sedate drums. 'Heavy Heart' is a lone reminder that intestinal fortitude used to be Meek's province, but overall, Wins & Losses is mostly the latter."

In a mixed review for PopMatters, writer William Sutton called the album "safe." He added that the album is "a good listen in places and evidence of Meek’s skillset. However, it doesn’t feel like it will be enough to reverse the losses that so many feel he has suffered of late. Writing for Mass Appeal, Khari Nixon wrote a largely positive review, saying: "while Wins and Losses may not be an instant classic, it stands as both a reminder and a statement of purpose for a talented MC whose skills bar for bar can’t be denied. Don't get lost in the hip hop soap opera, when it comes to this rap shit, Meek Mill is still winning." Scott Glaysher of XXL commented that "Meek has visibly shifted his dial from 'completely lost' to 'approaching victory.'" He continued, "If nothing else, Wins & Losses is a display of optimism from a rapper who briefly yet substantially fell from hip-hop's good graces but aims to make his way back in a major way."

Commercial performance
Wins and Losses debuted at number three on the US Billboard 200 with 102,000 album-equivalent units, of which 37,000 were pure album sales in its first week of release. In its second week, the album remained at number three on the chart earning 37,000 album-equivalent units. In its third week the album fell to number four on the chart. On April 13, 2018, the album was certified gold by the Recording Industry Association of America for combined sales and album-equivalent units of over 500,000 units in the United States.

Track listing
Credits adapted from Tidal.

Notes
  signifies a co-producer
  signifies an additional producer
  signifies an uncredited additional producer
 "Wins & Losses" features additional vocals by Dr. Eric Thomas
 "Heavy Heart" features additional vocals by Sitara Kanhai
 "Fall Thru" features additional vocals by Aria Minor
 "Made It from Nothing" features additional vocals by Adela

Sample credits
 "Wins & Losses" contains a sample from Variation 8, performed by Andrew Lloyd Webber.
 "Whatever You Need" contains a sample from "Whatever You Want", performed by Tony! Toni! Toné!.
 "These Scars" contains a sample of Alan Hawkshaw's original composition "Strangelands".
 "Young Black America" contains a sample from "Blueprint (Momma Loves Me)", performed by Jay-Z.
 "Open" contains a sample from "Worn", performed by Corbin.
 "Price" contains a sample from "Empty Love", performed by Submotion Orchestra.
 "Left Hollywood" contains a sample from "I Found", performed by Amber Run.
 "Save Me" contains a sample from "Crave You (Adventure Club Remix)", performed by Giselle Rosselli and Flight Facilities.

Personnel
Credits adapted from Tidal.

Musicians
 Marie Breton – guitar 
 Maxine Phillippe – guitar 

Technical
 Anthony Cruz – recording 
 James Belt – recording assistant 
 William Dougan – recording assistant 
 Junie On The Beat – recording assistant 
 James Royo – additional recording 

 Miles Walker – mixing 
 Jaycen Joshua – mixing 
 Ryan Jumper – mixing assistant , mixing 
 David Nakaji – mixing assistant 
 Ivan Jimenez – mixing assistant 
 Colin Leonard – mastering 

Additional personnel
 Will Ngo – photography
 Chaz Morgan – art direction

Charts

Weekly charts

Year-end charts

Certifications

References

Meek Mill albums
2017 albums
Albums produced by 1500 or Nothin'
Albums produced by DJ Mustard
Albums produced by Honorable C.N.O.T.E.
Albums produced by Illmind
Albums produced by Street Symphony
Atlantic Records albums
Maybach Music Group albums